Andaloor is a place located in Dharmadam village in Thalassery taluk of Kerala state, South India. 
This is the place where Andaloor Kavu is situated.
Andaloor is well known for the ancient art form  Theyyam.

The Thaze Kavu, part of the Andaloor Kavu, has the remnants of a sacred grove. It is one of the few remaining habitats for the  species typical of the Myristica swamps, notably Syzygium travancoricum, an endangered endemic plant. Heavy disturbance in this highly populated area is a threat to the sacred grove.

See also
Andalurkavu
Dharmadom
Kannur
Mangalore

External links 

 Sree Andalurkavu — 
 Places in Thalassery — Independent site about Thalassery

Thalassery road, Kannur